Morgan Bird (born September 6, 1993) is a Canadian Paralympic swimmer who competes in international level events, she specialises in freestyle. She won a bronze medal, at the 2020 Summer Paralympics, in Women's 34pts 4x100m relay.

She is a double Parapan American Games champion and double World silver medalist.

References

External links
 
 

1993 births
Living people
Sportspeople from Regina, Saskatchewan
Paralympic swimmers of Canada
Canadian female freestyle swimmers
Swimmers at the 2012 Summer Paralympics
Swimmers at the 2016 Summer Paralympics
Swimmers at the 2020 Summer Paralympics
Medalists at the 2020 Summer Paralympics
Swimmers at the 2018 Commonwealth Games
Commonwealth Games competitors for Canada
Medalists at the 2015 Parapan American Games
Swimmers with cerebral palsy
Cerebral Palsy category Paralympic competitors
S8-classified Paralympic swimmers
Commonwealth Games medallists in swimming
Commonwealth Games silver medallists for Canada
Medallists at the 2018 Commonwealth Games